Phrygionis is a neotropical moth genus in the family Geometridae.

Phrygionis have relatively conspicuous wing patterns, which probably led to overestimation of their species richness in the past. In most species, the forewing measures  in length.

Species
 Phrygionis argentata (Drury, 1773)
 Phrygionis auriferaria Hulst, 1887
 Phrygionis bicornis Scoble, 1994
 Phrygionis cruorata Warren, 1905
 Phrygionis ferreus Scoble, 1994
 Phrygionis flavilimes Warren 1907
 Phrygionis incolorata Prout, 1910
 Phrygionis ochrilineis Scoble, 1994
 Phrygionis paradoxata (Guenée, 1858)
 Phrygionis platinata (Guenee, 1857)
 Phrygionis polita (Cramer, 1780)
 Phrygionis privignaria (Guenee 1857)
 Phrygionis rawlinsi Scoble, 1994
 Phrygionis sumptuosaria (Moschler, 1886)

References

Baptini